Hossam Abdul-Majeed  (born 30 April 2001) is an Egyptian professional footballer who plays as a centre-back for Zamalek.

Career statistics

Club

Notes

References

External links 

Zamalek SC on FIFA.com
Zamalek SC on CAF
Zamalek SC on Egyptian Football Association

2001 births
Living people
Egyptian footballers
Association football defenders
Zamalek SC players
Egyptian Premier League players